Mohamed Ammi (born 1928) was a French boxer. He competed in the men's featherweight event at the 1948 Summer Olympics. At the 1948 Summer Olympics, he defeated Peter Brander of Great Britain in the Round of 32 before losing to Dennis Shepherd of South Africa in the Round of 16.

References

External links
 

1928 births
Possibly living people
French male boxers
Olympic boxers of France
Boxers at the 1948 Summer Olympics
Sportspeople from Algiers
Featherweight boxers